Gornovița may refer to several villages in Romania:

 Gornovița, a village in the town of Tismana, Gorj County
 Gornovița, a village in Balta Commune, Mehedinți County